Ain Mohammed is an abandoned village in Qatar, located in the municipality of Ash Shamal.  It is located about 1.5 km southwest of the abandoned village of Freiha. To the north is a series of small hills known as Al Jebailat.

Etymology
Named after a local well, the first constituent of the village's name, "ain", refers to a natural source of water in Arabic. "Mohammed" was the name of the individual who built the well which supplied water to the village.

History
In 1908, J.G. Lorimer recorded Ain Mohammed in his Gazetteer of the Persian Gulf, giving its location as "2 miles north-east of Zubarah". He makes note of a masonry well, 3 fathoms deep, yielding indifferent water, and a ruined fort.

Archaeology
Rock carvings have been discovered at Ain Mohammed.

Gallery

References

Al Shamal